, also known as ROCKETMAN, is a Japanese comedian and musician. He belongs to Watanabe Entertainment. On television he generally takes minor roles and is characterized by his childlike temperament and boyish looks. He is also a member of the owarai group, No Plan.

Fukawa graduated from the Department of Economics at Keio University. He is cousin to manga artist Tetsuo Hara.

References

External links
Ryō Fukawa's official page 

Japanese comedians
1974 births
Living people
People from Yokohama
Keio University alumni
Nippon Columbia artists
Musicians from Kanagawa Prefecture
Watanabe Entertainment